The UK Regulators Network (UKRN) is an association of 14 regulators from the United Kingdom's utility, financial and transport sectors. The network: "fosters close working relationships between member regulators to enhance investment and efficiency for the benefit of consumers in the UK".

Members
The fourteen members of the UKRN are listed below. 
 The Civil Aviation Authority (CAA)
 The Financial Conduct Authority (FCA)
 The Financial Reporting Council (FRC)
 The Information Commissioner's Office (ICO) 
 The Legal Services Board (LSB)
 The Northern Ireland Authority for Utility Regulation (UR)
 The Office of Gas & Electricity Markets (OfGEM)
 The Office of Communications (Ofcom)
 The Office of Rail & Road (ORR)
 The Payment Systems Regulator (PSR)
 The Pensions Regulator (TPR)
 The Regulator of Social Housing (RSH)
 The Single Source Regulations Office (SSRO)
 The Water Services Regulation Authority (Ofwat)

Personnel
The Chief Executive of the UKRN (February 2021) is Jonathan Brearley.

References

External links
 UKRN website

Regulators of the United Kingdom